Valentin Niculae Ursache (born 12 August 1985 in Târgu Neamt) is a Romanian former rugby union player.

Ursache played in Romania for Contor Zenner Arad, Steaua Bucharest and CSM Baia Mare. He also played in France for Pays d'Aix RC and Oyonnax, from where he retired in June 2022. 

Ursache has 55 caps for Romania, since his debut at 26 June 2004, in the historical 25-24 win over Italy, in Bucharest, in a test match. He played twice at the 2007 Rugby World Cup, coming on both times as a substitute. He was called into the squad for the 2011 Rugby World Cup, playing in three matches. He also played in four group stage matches of Romania's 2015 Rugby World Cup campaign.

On 29 April 2013, Ursache was named honorary citizen of Oyonnax.

Honours

Club 
Steaua București
Romanian Cup: 2007

CSM Baia Mare
SuperLiga Champion: 2009, 2010

Oyonnax
Pro D2 Champion: 2012–13, 2016–17

References

External links

 
 
 
 

1985 births
Living people
People from Târgu Neamț
Romanian rugby union players
Romania international rugby union players
București Wolves players
CSA Steaua București (rugby union) players
CSM Știința Baia Mare players
Provence Rugby players
Oyonnax Rugby players
Rugby union locks
Romanian expatriate rugby union players
Expatriate rugby union players in France
Romanian expatriate sportspeople in France